Makhosi C. Vilakati (died 23 January 2021) was a Swazi politician.

He was the Minister of Labour and Social Security of Eswatini from 2019 till his death in 2021. Vilakati died from COVID-19.

References

20th-century births
2021 deaths
Labour ministers of Eswatini
Government ministers of Eswatini
Deaths from the COVID-19 pandemic in South Africa